Rough Play (lit. "An Actor Is an Actor") is a 2013 South Korean film about an actor (played by Lee Joon) who becomes a superstar overnight then hits rock bottom. It is written and executive produced by Kim Ki-duk, and directed by Shin Yeon-shick. It screened at the 18th Busan International Film Festival, and was released in theaters on October 24, 2013.

Plot
Oh Young (Lee Joon) is an intense young actor, full of vigor for his chosen field. He currently performs regularly for a small theater company as well as playing minor roles in movies. A manager named Kim Jang-Ho (Seo Bum-Suk) then spots Oh Young on the filming set of a movie. He sees potential in Oh Young and offers to make him a top actor. After signing his contract, Oh Young's role in the movie is rewritten into a major supporting character. Once the movie is released, Oh Young receives praise for his performance and also becomes a burgeoning celebrity. As his popularity rises, Oh Young's life quickly spirals out of control.

Cast
Lee Joon - Oh Young 
Seo Young-hee - Oh Yeon-hee
Kang Shin-hyo - Woo Geun
Kyung Sung-hwan - Department head Kim
Min Ji-woo - Hong Ji-min
Seo Beom-seok - Kim Jang-ho
Lee Hwa-shi - Rich madam
Sung Hong-il - Representative Kang
Kim In-soo - Director of Rice Cake Hat
Kim Jung-seok - Director of Moebius
Lee Hyun-ho - Assistant director of Moebius
Kim So-yeon - Moebius actress
Lee Sae-byul - Schoolgirl
Gi Ju-bong - Theater director
Oh Kwang-rok - Jo Kang-ho
Ma Dong-seok - "Tenacious" gang boss
Yang Dong-geun - Kang Bin
Kim Hyung-jun - Rookie
Ahn Sung-ki - Jeonju festival VIP
Lee Choon-yeon - Jeonju festival VIP
Ryoo Seung-wan - Jeonju festival VIP
Kim Kkot-bi - Jeonju festival VIP
Lee Bit-na - Advertisement Girl

Awards and nominations

References

External links
  
 
 
 

South Korean drama films
2013 films
Films about filmmaking
Films about actors
Films directed by Shin Yeon-shick
2010s South Korean films